Hoxton Park High School is a government-funded co-educational comprehensive secondary day school, located in , a south-western suburb of Sydney, New South Wales, Australia.

Established in 1974 in what was then a rural district, the school now caters for approximately 700 students from Year 7 to Year 12. The school is operated by the New South Wales Department of Education and attracts students from rural areas to the west such as Austral and Kemps Creek. Its feed schools include Hoxton Park Public School, Hinchinbrook Public School and Middleton Grange Public School.

Curriculum 
Hoxton Park High School offers a  range of courses for students within the fields of English, mathematics, science, social sciences, history, the creative and performing arts, PDHPE/sport and technology. There is a strong academic focus with students supported to achieve their personal best, the introduction of the Self-Select class for Years 7 and 8, and staff working closely with senior students to improve their application and achievement in all areas. Vocational Education and Training (VET) is a particular feature of the school, with students able to select from courses such as Hospitality, Metal and Engineering, Construction, Retail and Primary Industries.

Students have a range of extra-curricular options available for them including sporting teams, the Duke of Edinburgh Award program, public speaking, music and the performing arts, agricultural activities and visual arts. Students are encouraged to take leadership opportunities within the school and community with many students seeking positions within the Prefect Body and the SRC. It is common to see the student leadership team working closely with the local primary schools.

See also 

 List of government schools in New South Wales
 Education in Australia

References

External links
 

Public high schools in Sydney
South Western Sydney
Educational institutions established in 1974
1974 establishments in Australia